John Francis O'Hara  (August 1, 1888 – August 28, 1960) was an American member of the Congregation of Holy Cross and prelate of the Catholic Church. He served as president of the University of Notre Dame (1934–1939) and as the Archbishop of Philadelphia from 1951 until his death, and was elevated to the cardinalate in 1958.

Biography

Early life and education
The fourth of ten children, O'Hara was born in Ann Arbor, Michigan, to John O'Hara and Ella Thornton. His father was a leader of the Irish American Catholic community, published a small newspaper and was active in Republican circles. 

He and his family moved to Bunker Hill, Indiana, two months after his birth, and later to Peru, Indiana, in 1889. He was attending Peru High School when, in 1905, his father was named by President Theodore Roosevelt as the United States consul to Uruguay. The family then moved to the South American country, where young John studied at the Catholic University of Uruguay in Montevideo and served as private secretary to Edward C. O'Brien, the United States Ambassador to Uruguay.

In 1906, O'Hara moved to Argentina and spent six months on a cattle ranch. Returning to Uruguay, he conducted market surveys for the United States Department of State. He furthered his studies, and then accompanied his father after the latter was transferred to Brazil.

Upon his return to the United States in 1908, O'Hara enrolled at the University of Notre Dame in Notre Dame, Indiana, where he also taught Spanish to defray the costs of tuition and board. In 1910, he became a founding officer of Notre Dame Knights of Columbus Council 1477, the first KofC College Council. After earning a bachelor's degree and graduating in 1911, he entered the Congregation of Holy Cross on August 8, 1912. He then studied theology at Holy Cross College, South American history under Peter Guilday at the Catholic University of America, and at the Wharton School of Finance and Commerce of the University of Pennsylvania. He made his profession as a member of the Congregation of Holy Cross on September 14, 1914.

Ordination and ministry
O'Hara was ordained to the priesthood by Bishop Joseph Chartrand of Indianapolis on September 9, 1916. He then returned to his alma mater of Notre Dame, where he served as prefect of religion and dean of the College of Commerce. O'Hara greatly fostered the practice of daily reception of Communion, then still a newly approved practice by the Catholic Church. He made national headlines when he arranged for two Notre Dame football players, on their way to a game against West Point, to receive Communion in Albany, New York; the team has since had the opportunity to receive Communion on trips away. He served as the dean of the College of Commerce from 1921 to 1924.

President of Notre Dame
O'Hara was appointed the Vice President of the University of Notre Dame in 1933, and its president in 1934. During his tenure at Notre Dame, he brought numerous refugee intellectuals to campus; he selected  Frank H. Spearman, Richard Reid, Jeremiah D. M. Ford, Irvin Abell, and Josephine Brownson for the prestigious Laetare Medal. President Franklin D. Roosevelt named him a delegate to the 1938 Pan-American Conference in Lima, and he was later invited by President Eleazar López Contreras to head a social service mission in Venezuela. O'Hara concentrated on expanding the graduate school. During his tenure, he made doctorates available in Philosophy, Physics, Mathematics, and Politics. O'Hara also carried forward the building program and led construction of a new laundry, the post office, and the infirmary. He also built the Rockne Memorial, Cavanaugh, Zahm and Breen-Phillips. 
O'Hara strongly believed that the Fighting Irish football team could be an effective means to "acquaint the public with the ideals that dominate" Notre Dame. He wrote, "Notre Dame football is a spiritual service because it is played for the honor and glory of God and of his Blessed Mother. When St. Paul said: 'Whether you eat or drink, or whatsoever else you do, do all for the glory of God,' he included football."

Apostolic Delegate for the Military Forces
On December 11, 1939, O'Hara was appointed by Pope Pius XII as an auxiliary bishop of the United States Military Ordinariate, which served the spiritual needs of the nation's armed forces, as well as the titular bishop of Milasa. He received his consecration as a bishop on January 15, 1940, from Archbishop Francis Spellman, with Bishops John F. Noll and Joseph Ritter serving as co-consecrators, in Sacred Heart Church in Indiana. A devotee of the Blessed Virgin Mary, he selected as his episcopal motto: "Following her, you will not go astray."

President Franklin D. Roosevelt later appointed O'Hara to the board of visitors of the Naval Academy in Annapolis, becoming the first Catholic bishop to be so honored.

Bishop of Buffalo
O'Hara was named the eighth bishop of Buffalo on March 10, 1945, and was installed on May 8 of that year. Succeeding the late John A. Duffy, O'Hara greatly expanded Catholic education in the diocese, and eliminated racial segregation in schools and churches. In 1946, during the American occupation following World War II, he and Michael J. Ready, the Bishop of Columbus, were sent to Japan to report on the condition of the Catholic Church in that country .

Archbishop of Philadelphia
O'Hara was promoted to the fifth Archbishop of Philadelphia on November 23, 1951. He received the pallium, a vestment worn by metropolitan bishops, from Cardinal Francis Spellman on May 12, 1953.

Differing in style from his predecessor, Cardinal Dennis Joseph Dougherty, he often answered his own doorbell, which he explained by saying "How else can I meet the poor?" During his tenure, O'Hara oversaw the establishment of sixty-one new schools, three women's colleges, and special schools for the mentally challenged, blind, and deaf. Beginning in 1955, he also restored and expanded the Cathedral of Ss. Peter and Paul. He condemned the Supreme Court's ruling against banning the films La Ronde and M. Moreover, not overly favorable of radio and television, he suggested that Catholics sacrifice such entertainment for Lent.

Pope John XXIII created O'Hara a Cardinal in the consistory of December 15, 1958, and appointed him a Cardinal-Priest with his titular church the Basilica of Ss. Andrea e Gregorio al Monte Celio. O'Hara was the first member of the Congregation of Holy Cross to be raised to the College of Cardinals. His health failing in his later years, he underwent several operations and took up to twenty-two different pills. O'Hara died following surgery in Philadelphia, at age 72. He is buried at the Basilica of the Sacred Heart in Notre Dame, Indiana.

Legacy
Cardinal O'Hara High School in Springfield, Pennsylvania, and Cardinal O'Hara High School in Tonawanda, New York, in the Diocese of Buffalo were named after the cardinal.

See also

 Catholic Church hierarchy
 Catholic Church in the United States
 Historical list of the Catholic bishops of the United States
 List of Catholic bishops of the United States
 List of Catholic bishops of the United States: military service
 Lists of patriarchs, archbishops, and bishops
 Military chaplain
 Religious symbolism in the United States military
 United States military chaplains

Further reading
 McAvoy, Thomas T. Father O'Hara of Notre Dame (1967), a scholarly biography

References

External links
 Archdiocese for the Military Services, USA, official website
 Archdiocese for the Military Services of the United States. GCatholic.org. Retrieved 2010-08-20.
Cardinals of the Holy Roman Church
 Roman Catholic Archdiocese of Philadelphia Official Website
 Roman Catholic Diocese of Buffalo

1888 births
1960 deaths
Clergy from Philadelphia
American Roman Catholic clergy of Irish descent
University of Notre Dame alumni
Catholic University of America alumni
Presidents of the University of Notre Dame
American military chaplains
Congregation of Holy Cross bishops
Roman Catholic bishops of Buffalo
20th-century American cardinals
Roman Catholic archbishops of Philadelphia
Cardinals created by Pope John XXIII
Burials at the Basilica of the Sacred Heart (Notre Dame)
Congregation of Holy Cross cardinals
People from Ann Arbor, Michigan